Lotus creticus is a species of perennial herb of the family Fabaceae found in tropical Africa. It is symbiosis competent  and engages in nitrogen-fixing symbiotic interactions with species of the Ensifer genus It comprises three varieties found in the Mediterranean although there is some controversy as to whether each subgroup could be considered the same species but are classically described as being subgroups. Varieties consist of the  most commonly cited silky-hairy var. creticus which is widely distributed in its western part of the coast, the non-silky var. glabrescens which has a western Mediterranean distribution;  and the eastern Mediterranean var. collinus which is also not silky and can be described by long petioles and peduncles.

Morphology 
Lotus creticus has been described as a perennial herb of 1–2F with diffuse copiously-branched densely grey-silky Appearance. Leaflets are fleshy and oblanceolate-cuneate. Flowers are in umbels with 4–8 on axillary peduncles. Pedicels are described as short and bracts as a compound, equalling or shorter than the calyx. Flowers are corolla yellow and twice the calyx with linear pods linear of 12–18 lines long, turgid with 9–15-seeds per pod.

Symbiosis  
Lotus creticus has been found to engage in nitrogen fixing symbiosis with Ensifer numidicus.

Distribution 
Lotus creticus is native to the Spanish Mediterranean coast. It can be found in a wide range of habitats ranging from sandy to heavy saline soils and from sea level to high altitudes.

Importance 
Lotus creticus  used in agriculture as an alternative to traditional covering plants as they experience rapid growth, have higher yields than traditional alternatives and are considered drought resistant.  L. creticus is also considered an important candidate for revegetation programs in Europe. It is a pioneer plant and can rapidly advance in poor soils. In studies comparing similar species in bioremediation, L. creticus showed the highest levels of dominance at the initial and oldest stages of the revegetation.

References 

creticus